Mark Allen is a software engineer, game programmer and game designer. As a student at the University of California, San Diego, Allen used UCSD Pascal to develop a 6502 interpreter for the Pascal language in 1978, along with Richard Gleaves. This work later became the basis for Apple Pascal in 1979.

Later, Allen developed a number of well-received computer games for the Apple II, including Stellar Invaders, Sabotage, and Pest Patrol. Sabotage, in particular, became a classic Apple II game and sparked numerous clones such as Paratrooper. One such clone, Parachute, was preloaded software on early iPods that had displays.

References

Living people
Year of birth missing (living people)
American computer programmers
University of California, San Diego alumni